The river limpet (Ancylus fluviatilis) is a species of very small, freshwater, air-breathing limpet, an aquatic pulmonate gastropod mollusk in the tribe Ancylini within the family Planorbidae, the ram's horn snails and their allies.

Description
The 5–8 mm.limpet-like shell has a backwardly directed, conical apex. The shell shape is higher than Acroloxus and Ferrissia.The apex is blunt when seen from above, but appears more pointed from the side. The shell is bent backwards and very weakly to the right side. It is thin and translucent, with reticulate sculpture and fine growth lines. In colour it is light yellowish to reddish brown or dull pale brown. The animal is grey with black dots near the head and almost entirely covered by the shell. The tentacles are triangular with eyes at their base. The genital pore and pneumostome are very small and located at the right side.

Distribution
The distribution type is (probably since de-limitation of various southern and eastern forms which may be given independent species status is not understood) Eurosiberian Southern-temperate.

This species occurs in Europe in the following countries and islands:

 The British Isles: Great Britain and Ireland
 Czech Republic
 Germany
 Netherlands
 Poland
 Slovakia
 France
 and others see Fauna Europaea.
 Not in the North of Norway, southern Sweden, Finland
In large parts of the Mediterranean area (Iberian Peninsula, Italy, etc.) occurring there are marked forms which according to molecular genetic are stand-alone forms so far not named their own. Such forms are also found in northeastern Africa (coastal areas of Morocco to Tunisia, Hoggar mountains in Algeria), as well as in the Highlands up to 2240 m above sea level in Ethiopia. It was found in Saudi Arabia (Brown and Wright 1980, Neubert 1998) and Yemen (Al-Safadi 1990) and in Caucasus (Armenia), but it is not known in the Afrotropical region.

Habitat 
This freshwater limpet is rheophile, which lives in oxygen-rich fast-running waters and also in karst springs. It does not occur in waters which freeze in winter. They need a hard substrate with suitable (not too low and not too rich) algae growth, which is why they are frequent in Central Europe especially in rivers and streams. In North America and Western Europe they occur in lakes. In contrast to many other freshwater snails, the animals tolerate a base-poor acidic environment. Southern European, North African and Middle East representative of the species group can survive exposure due to low water levels up to a certain extent by forming a protective layer on the underside of the shell. In Central European forms, this is possible only to a limited extent, but they may survive low water levels by adhering firmly on the stone surface.

References

Further reading 
 Streit B. (1981). "Food searching and exploitation by a primary consumer (Ancylus fluviatilis) in a stochastic environment: Nonrandom movement pattern". Revue Suisse Zoologie 88: 887-895.

External links 
Ancylus fluviatilis at Animalbase taxonomy, short description, distribution, biology, status (threats), images 
Ancylus fluviatilis images at  Consortium for the Barcode of Life 
 photo 1
 photo 2

Planorbidae
Gastropods of Asia
Gastropods of Europe
Freshwater snails of Africa
Freshwater animals of Asia
Freshwater animals of Europe
Gastropods described in 1774
Taxa named by Otto Friedrich Müller